Karel Kubát (born June 13, 1988) is a Czech professional ice hockey defenceman. He is currently playing for HSC Csíkszereda in the Erste Liga.

He made his professional debut during the 2007–08 Czech Extraliga season for HC Litvínov of the Czech Extraliga.  He has formerly played with Admiral Vladivostok in the Kontinental Hockey League (KHL) and with Polish team Podhale Nowy Targ.

Career statistics

Regular season and playoffs

References

External links

1988 births
Admiral Vladivostok players
Czech ice hockey defencemen
HC Litvínov players
HC Most players
Living people
HC Sparta Praha players
HKM Zvolen players
HC Slovan Ústečtí Lvi players
Piráti Chomutov players
HC Stadion Litoměřice players
Sportovní Klub Kadaň players
Podhale Nowy Targ players
Sportspeople from Ústí nad Labem
Czech expatriate ice hockey players in Russia
Czech expatriate ice hockey players in Slovakia
Czech expatriate sportspeople in Poland
Expatriate ice hockey players in Poland
Expatriate ice hockey players in Romania
Czech expatriate sportspeople in Romania